Teraoka is a Japanese surname meaning "temple on a hill". Notable people with the surname include:

 Adam Teraoka (born 1967), American artist and Rams fan
 Carlos B. Teraoka (born 1930), Filipino-Japanese businessman and chairman of the Filipino-Japanese Foundation of Northern Luzon
 Jason Teraoka (born 1964), American artist
 Masami Teraoka (born 1936), Japanese-American contemporary artist

Japanese-language surnames